Charles Emmanuel may refer to:
Charles Emmanuel de Savoie, 3rd Duc de Nemours (1567–1595)
Charles Emmanuel I, Duke of Savoy (1562–1630)
Charles Emmanuel II, Duke of Savoy (1634–1675)
Charles Emmanuel III of Sardinia (1701–1773)
Charles McArthur Emmanuel, U.S. citizen and the son of Charles Taylor, former President of Liberia
Charles Emmanuel, Prince of Carignano (1770–1800)
Charles Emmanuel, Landgrave of Hesse-Rotenburg (1746–1812)
Charles Emmanuel de Barros Marcondes (1989-), Brazilian voice actor